"You Left the Water Running" is a soul music song written by Dan Penn, Rick Hall and Oscar Franks.

Otis Redding recording
Redding's connection to the song is documented by music journalist Dave Marsh in his 1989 book The Heart of Rock and Soul.  In 1966, Redding was visiting FAME Studios in Muscle Shoals, Alabama, when studio owner Rick Hall requested Redding help them with an upcoming session.  Wilson Pickett was to record "You Left the Water Running", and Hall wished for Redding to record a demo to assist with the production.  A simple recording was made and Redding made some overdub additions, and Pickett made his recording similar to Redding's version.

Ten years later, Marsh was mailed a promo copy of "You Left the Water Running" by Redding on Stone Records (the flipside was an instrumental called "The Otis Jam", which was produced by John Fred, of "Judy in Disguise (with Glasses)" fame). Marsh was fascinated by the song, and mentioned the new single to several friends, including his attorney, who also happened to represent the Redding estate. He soon found out that Stone Records had not obtained the Redding family's permission to release the long-lost demo recording, and demanded the single be pulled from circulation.

When Marsh asked the label's distributor what was to become of the single, he was informed that they were to be destroyed.  Instead, Marsh purchased the copies that remained, and gave them out as gifts, with the attorney's permission.  As a result, the single (Stone 209) is now highly valuable.

Atlantic Records released "You Left the Water Running" for the first time legally on the compilation album The Otis Redding Story in 1987.  Though that box set is no longer available, the song has appeared in similar collections in the years that have followed.

Cover versions
Barbara Lynn's 1966 version of "You Left the Water Running" reached #42 on Billboard's Top Selling R&B Singles chart. The song has been recorded by many other artists, including Wilson Pickett, Don Varner (1967), Billy Young, Maurice & Mac, Armazing Rhythm Aces, The Flying Burrito Brothers, Bobby Hatfield, James & Bobby Purify, Ken Boothe and Huey Lewis and the News (on Four Chords & Several Years Ago (1994)), Billy Price & The Keystone Rhythm Band (1980)  .

Bibliography
Marsh, Dave.  The Heart of Rock and Soul.  New York; Plume, 1989.,

References

1966 songs
1976 singles
Songs written by Dan Penn
Songs written by Rick Hall
Otis Redding songs
James & Bobby Purify songs